Bankers Row Historic District is a national historic district located at Logansport, Cass County, Indiana. The district encompasses 20 contributing houses in a residential section of Logansport.  It developed between about 1875 and 1925 and includes notable examples of Queen Anne and Italianate style architecture.
Bankers Row gains significance because it is associated with the growth and development of Logansport.  The town gained commercial success in 1840 with the Wabash & Erie Canal, and then in the 1850s, when the first railroad came through town. The name "Bankers Row" was given to these homes by locals in the 1960s because of its association in the earlier part of the century, with men in the field of finance and banking.

It was listed on the National Register of Historic Places in 1999.

Description
Bankers Row Historic District is a single row of historic buildings, on the northeast side of Eel River Avenue in Logansport, Indiana. The homes face the street and with the Eel River as their backyard. These lots are on a low bluff above the Eel Rivers flood levels. The buildings are slightly set back from the avenue, with only a few empty lots. Most buildings were built within the period of 1890 - 1900. The historic district is the northwest boundary of the old downtown.  The south side of Eel River Avenue is the northern border of the Point Historic District.
 72 Eel River Avenue; Gabled Ell; c.1880–1900
 76 Eel River Avenue; Bungalow; c. 1910
 80 Eel River Avenue; Queen Anne; c. 1895
 94 Eel River Avenue; Queen Anne; c. 1890
 98 Eel River Avenue; Italianate; c. 1875
 102 Eel River Avenue; Queen Anne; c. 1900
 110 Eel River Avenue; Wiggs House; Queen Anne; c. 1885
 118 Eel River Avenue; Fines-Campbell House; Queen Anne; 1878–1894
 124 Eel River Avenue; Italianate; c. 1880
 128 Eel River Avenue; Oilman House; Italianate/Greek Revival; c. 1880
 136 Eel River Avenue; Italianate/ Italian Villa; c.1875
 142 Eel River Avenue; Queen Anne; c. 1890
 200 Eel River Avenue; American Four-Square/Prairie; c. 1890–1905
 204 Eel River Avenue; Queen Anne; c. 1900
 208 Eel River Avenue; Queen Anne/Colonial Revival; c.1900
 210 Eel River Avenue; Queen Anne; c. 1895
 218 Eel River Avenue; Queen Anne/Italianate; C. 1880
 222 Eel River Avenue; American Four Square/Queen Anne; c. 1900
 226-228 Eel River Avenue; Gable Front; c. 1920

References

Bibliography
Blumenthal, John J. - G. Identifying American Architecture, A Pictorial Guide to Styles and Terms 1600-1945 Nashville, TN: American Association for State and Local History,977 1977.
Cass County Interim Report, Indiana Historic Sites and Structures Survey. Indianapolis, IN: Indiana Dept. of Natural Resources, Division of Historic Preservation & Archaeology, June 1984.
Cornelius, L'Dean and Julian, R. W., Eds. Where Two Rivers Meet, A View of the Past. Logansport, IN: Cass County Historical Society, 1978. 
Helm, Thomas B. History of Cass County, Indiana; from the earliest time to the present ... Evansville, IN: Unigraphic, Inc., 1970, Reprint, originally published Chicago: Brant & Fuller, 1886.
Houk, Richard J. The Geography of Logansport, Indiana, MA Thesis, Department of Geology & Geography, Indiana University, October, 1942.
Kloenne, C. E., Julius, C. Map of the City of Logansport, Cass County, Indiana, 1876.
Longwell & Cummings. Directory of Logansport, Indiana, 1892–93. Logansport, IN: Longwell & Cummings, 1892.
McAlester, Virginia & Lee. Field Guide to American Houses. New York: Alfred A. Knopf, 1992.
Poppeliers, John. What Style Is It? Washington DC: The Preservation Press, 1977.
Powell, Jehu Z. History of Cass county, Indiana: From its earliest settlement to the present time; with biographical sketches and reference to biographies previously compiled, Vol. I & Vol. II. Evansville, IN: Unigraphic, 1972, Reprint, originally published by Lewis Publishing Co., 1913.
Schulz, Miss Mary, ed. Old Homes of Logansport, Indiana. Logansport, Indiana: Typed MSS, Cass County Historical Society, 1960.
Taber, Graham. History of Logansport and Cass County. Logansport, IN: Pharos-Tribune, n.d.
Wright, W. Swift. Pastime Sketches: Scenes and Events at "The Mouth of Eel on the

Houses on the National Register of Historic Places in Indiana
Historic districts on the National Register of Historic Places in Indiana
Italianate architecture in Indiana
Queen Anne architecture in Indiana
Houses in Cass County, Indiana
Historic districts in Cass County, Indiana
National Register of Historic Places in Cass County, Indiana
Logansport, Indiana